Tancred's Tower, known in Arabic as Qasr (al-)Jalud ("Goliath's Castle"), was a large tower at the northwest corner of the Old City of Jerusalem, of which only meager remains were unearthed by archaeologists.

Parts of it are in the external base of the city wall where the section coming from the New Gate to the northeast meets the section coming from Jaffa Gate to the southeast.

Names
The name may be from traditions about Goliath or an allusion to its size or a reference to the Tower of David.

Excavation
The remains of the tower were discovered during excavations led by Dan Bahat and Menashe Ben-Ari of the Department of Antiquities in 1971-72.

History
The remains are of a large tower, probably first built in the 11th century during the Fatimid period, when the Christian community was forced by decree in 1063 to erect a new wall complete with towers in the north-western part of the city. Sources speak of a forewall, moat, and main wall. During the 1099 siege at the end of the First Crusade, the city and tower fell to the Franks, who later referred to it as Tancred's Tower because it was at this spot that the Italo-Norman leader first attempted to scale Jerusalem's city wall by ladder on 13 June 1099. During the Crusader reign over the city, there was a postern gate adjacent to the tower. Lepers were housed in the vicinity of the tower already around 1130, and later became organised as the crusading military order of Saint Lazarus. The tower was apparently expanded by the Ayyubids after Saladin's reconquest of the city in 1187, but it was destroyed along with the entire city wall sometime later, possibly in 1219, when Ayyubid ruler al-Mu'azzam Isa razed most of the city fortifications.

Description
The tower footprint, which measures approximately 35 × 35 metres, was found to protrude by some 3 metres from underneath the 16th-century Ottoman city wall, built on top of the medieval tower's ruins, which were levelled for the purpose. It was found that the tower was separated from the city wall on its north and west sides by a street. The contemporary city wall follows closely the tower's outline, and is bordered to the north and west by two moat segments, excavated to a depth of c. 7 metres.

References

External links
  including the city walls and the remains of the tower.

Buildings and structures in Jerusalem
Historic sites in Jerusalem
Archaeological sites in Jerusalem
Medieval sites in Jerusalem
Castles and fortifications of the Kingdom of Jerusalem